Ivan Gomina (born 1 July 1952) is a Colombian former swimmer. He competed in two events at the 1968 Summer Olympics.

References

External links
 

1952 births
Living people
Colombian male swimmers
Olympic swimmers of Colombia
Swimmers at the 1968 Summer Olympics
Swimmers from Paris
20th-century Colombian people